János Nagy (born 23 September 1928) is a former Hungarian diplomat and politician, who served as Hungarian Ambassador to the United States between 1968 and 1971.

He entered foreign service in 1948. He was appointed Envoy to Indonesia in March 1957, at the age of 28. The external relations between Hungary and Indonesia were extended to embassy level in September 1959. Nagy served in this capacity until October 1960. From 1963 to 1967, he was Hungarian Ambassador to India in New Delhi, also accredited to Burma, Nepal, Ceylon and Cambodia. Returning from Washington, D.C. in 1971, he served as Deputy Minister of Foreign Affairs (1971–1980) under ministers János Péter and Frigyes Puja, then as Secretary of State from 1980 to 1985.

Between 1985 and 1990, he was Hungarian Ambassador to Austria, also accredited to international organizations and the International Atomic Energy Agency (IAEA), based in Vienna. He retired on 31 August 1990.

References

Sources

External links
 Diplomatic Representation for Hungary

1928 births
Living people
Hungarian diplomats
Members of the Hungarian Socialist Workers' Party
Ambassadors of Hungary to the United States
Ambassadors of Hungary to India
Ambassadors of Hungary to Indonesia
Ambassadors of Hungary to Austria